Susana Santos Silva (born 3 January 1979 in Porto, Portugal) is a Portuguese jazz and free improvisation musician (trumpet, flugelhorn, and flute).

Biography 
Santos studied jazz trumpet at the Music College in Porto until 2008 and then the Hochschule für Musik Karlsruhe with Reinhold Friedrich, Edward Tarr, Klaus Schuwerk and Klaus Braker, subsequently  Jazz Performance at the  Rotterdam Conservatory (Diplom 2010), where she played with Eric Vloeimans, Jarmo Hoogendijk and Wim Both. She played in the Orquestra Jazz de Matosinhos (inter alia with Lee Konitz, Chris Cheek, Kurt Rosenwinkel and Maria João as guest musicians in CD productions), in European Movement Jazz Orchestra (EMJO Live at Coimbra, Clean Feed Records 2011) and in the Dutch trio LAMA (with Gonçalo Almeida and Greg Smith). In 2011 Santos released her debut album Devil's Dress (Toap). She is currently working with the bassist Torbjörn Zetterberg (Almost Tomorrow, 2013, Clean Feed) and with the ensemble SSS-Q (Songs from My Backyard, 2014). All About Jazz refers to Santos as one of the most original and articulate voices of European avantgarde jazz and non-idiomatic music.

Discography (in selection)

Solo albums 
 Susana Santos Silva Quintet (Demian Cabaud, Marcos Cavaleiro, André Fernandes, Zé Pedro Coelho)
 2011: Devil's Dress (Tone Of A Pitch)

 With Torbjörn Zetterberg
 2013: Almost Tomorrow (Clean Feed)

 With João Pedro Brandão, Hugo Raro, Torbjörn Zetterberg, and Marcos Cavaleiro
 2015: Impermanence (Carimbo Porta-Jazz)

 With Torbjörn Zetterberg and Hampus Lindwall
 2015: If Nothing Else (Clean Feed)

 With Santos Silva/Wodrascka/Meaas Svendsen/Berre
 2016: Rasengan! (Barefoot Records)

 With Santos Silva/Stadhouders/Almeida/Costa
 2016: Buku (Cylinder Recordings)

 With Lotte Anker, Sten Sandell, Torbjörn Zetterberg and Jon Fält
 2016: Life And Other Transient Storms (Clean Feed)

Collaborations 
 With The European Movement Jazz Orchestra
 2011: EMJO Live In Coimbra  (Clean Feed)

 With LAMA
 2011: Oneiros (Clean Feed)
 2013: Lamaçal (Clean Feed), featuring Chris Speed
 2015: The Elephant's Journey (Clean Feed), featuring Joachim Badenhorst
 2017: Metamorphosis (Clean Feed), featuring Joachim Badenhorst

 With SSS-Q (Jorge Queijo)
 2014: Songs From My Backyard (Wasser Bassin)
 2017: S/T (Wasser Bassin), featuring Carlos Guedes

 With De Beren Gieren
 2014: The Detour Fish (Clean Feed)

 With Fire! Orchestra
 2016: Ritual (Rune Grammofon)
 2019: Arrival (Rune Grammofon)

 With Fred Frith
 2023: Laying Demons to Rest (RogueArt)

 With Kaja Draksler
 2016: This Love (Clean Feed)

 With Fred Frith Trio
 2021: Road (Intakt)

References

External links 

 Official website
 Portrait a t All About Jazz
 Portrait at OJM

Flugelhorn players
1979 births
Portuguese jazz trumpeters
Living people
21st-century trumpeters
RogueArt artists